Mahige is a small islet in Isabel Province of the Solomon Islands. The islet is located off the south-east tip of Santa Isabel Island.

References

Islands of the Solomon Islands